Jeffrey McFadden is a Canadian classical guitarist, and a recording artist for Naxos Records. He is known for his recordings of works by composers of the romantic era such as Fernando Sor and Napoleon Coste.  His latest recording features the works of the Paraguayan guitarist-composer Agustín Barrios. He is also a noted editor and arranger,  and wrote the standard text on guitar harmony Fretboard Harmony: Common Practice Harmony on the Guitar (d'OZ, 2010).  His performances and recording have received critical notice in major media outlets such as the London Daily Telegraph, The Ottawa Citizen, and Gramophone UK.

McFadden was born in 1963 in Hamilton, Ontario, Canada. He attended the University of Western Ontario, finishing first in his class in 1984. Later he attended the University of Toronto where he was an Eaton Graduate Fellow and studied under Norbert Kraft. He was a silver medalist in the 1992 Guitar Foundation of America competition.  He is currently  Head of Guitar Studies and Associate Professor in the Faculty of Music at the University of Toronto. In 2010, Jeffrey McFadden became the first ever graduate of the Doctor of Musical Arts degree program at the University of Toronto. Jeffrey McFadden is currently the artistic director of the Sauble Beach Guitar Festival.

Discography 
 Guitar Recital (Naxos 8.553401)
 Sor - Works for Solo Guitar Opp. 26–30 (Naxos 8.553451)
 Sor - Works for Solo Guitar Opp. 46–51 (Naxos 8.553985)
 Coste - Works for Solo Guitar (Naxos 8.554192)
 Coste - 25 études, Op. 38 (Naxos 8.554354)
 Riley and others - Music for Guitar and Flute (Naxos     8.559146)
 Barrios  - Guitar Music vol.3 (Naxos 8.557807)

References

External links 
Official website

Canadian classical guitarists
Canadian male guitarists
1963 births
Living people